Acacia subrigida is a shrub of the genus Acacia and the subgenus Phyllodineae. It is native to an area in the  Wheatbelt, Mid West and Goldfields-Esperance regions of Western Australia.

It blooms from August to October and produces yellow flowers.

See also
List of Acacia species

References

subrigida
Acacias of Western Australia
Taxa named by Bruce Maslin